William Howden (11 November 1879 – 27 January 1937) was a Scottish footballer who played as a goalkeeper.

Career
Howden played club football for Rutherglen Glencairn, Rangers, Partick Thistle (where he made 233 appearances in all competitions) and Abercorn.

He was capped for Scotland once, playing in a 4–0 win against Ireland in 1905.

References

1879 births
Scottish footballers
Scotland international footballers
Rutherglen Glencairn F.C. players
Rangers F.C. players
Partick Thistle F.C. players
Benburb F.C. players
Abercorn F.C. players
Association football goalkeepers
1937 deaths
Scottish emigrants to Canada
Footballers from Renfrewshire
People from Barrhead
Scottish Football League players
Scottish Junior Football Association players